Marc Jozef Emmers (born 25 February 1966 in Hamont-Achel) is a retired Belgian footballer. 

His former clubs include KV Mechelen, R.S.C. Anderlecht and AC Lugano. With K.V. Mechelen, he won the Belgian Cup in 1987, the European Cup Winner's Cup and the European Super Cup in 1988 and the Belgian First Division title in 1989. After his transfer to the great R.S.C. Anderlecht of the mid-1990s, he won the Belgian First Division title three times from 1994 to 97.

Emmers was a versatile player who was mainly played out as a midfielder. Through his career, he played at the position of libero, defensive midfielder, attacking midfielder and right-back.

International career
Emmers also played for Belgium and was in the squad for two World Cups. At the 1990 World Cup, he played all three group stage matches, and in 1994, he participated in another three games.

Personal life
Emmers is the father of the Belgian footballer Xian Emmers.

Honours

Player 
KV Mechelen

 Belgian First Division: 1988–89
 Belgian Cup: 1990-91 (runners-up), 1991-92 (runners-up)
 European Cup Winners Cup: 1987–88 (winners)
 European Super Cup: 1988
 Amsterdam Tournament: 1989
Joan Gamper Trophy: 1989
 Jules Pappaert Cup: 1990

Anderlecht 

 Belgian First Division: 1992-93, 1993-94, 1994-95
 Belgian Cup: 1993-94 (winners), 1996-97 (runners-up)
 Belgian Super Cup: 1993

Individual 

 Man of the Season (Belgian First Division): 1988-89
 Belgian Professional Footballer of the Year: 1988-89

References

External links

1966 births
Living people
Footballers from Limburg (Belgium)
Belgian footballers
Belgian expatriate footballers
K. Waterschei S.V. Thor Genk players
R.S.C. Anderlecht players
K.V. Mechelen players
A.C. Perugia Calcio players
FC Lugano players
1990 FIFA World Cup players
1994 FIFA World Cup players
Belgium international footballers
Belgian Pro League players
Serie B players
Expatriate footballers in Switzerland
Expatriate footballers in Italy
Belgian expatriate sportspeople in Switzerland
Belgian expatriate sportspeople in Italy
People from Hamont-Achel
Association football midfielders
K.F.C. Diest players